Witness Tha Realest is the debut album by rapper Tha Realest. The album was released on July 14, 2009 by RBC Records/Team Dime Entertainment and distributed by E1 Music (formerly Koch Records). Witness tha Realest''' was delayed on several occasions due to the lack of a record distributor and the dissolution of Tru 'Dat' Entertainment. It features production from 1500 or Nothin', Blaqthoven, Mark Sparks, The Underdogs, Mel-Man, Detail of Konvict Music, E. Poppi, DJ Domo of Rap-a-Lot Records, Alif, Marvin "Marvelous" Paige and Eric Reese.

Background
The Realest planned to release his debut album as early as 2004 but due to the lack of a distributing company, the album's release was delayed. Witness Tha Realest'' would again be scheduled for release, this time in 2007, as Tha Realest had been signed on to Tru 'Dat' Entertainment in 2006. This date was further pushed back following the bankruptcy of the label after the owner, Hysear Randell, was found guilty of embezzling millions of dollars. In late 2007, Tha Realest was signed to Team Dime Entertainment, the label on which the album was released in partnership with RBC and KOCH Records.

Track listing

References

2009 debut albums
Albums produced by Detail (record producer)
Albums produced by the Underdogs (production team)
Albums produced by 1500 or Nothin'